La Paloma Dam re-directs here.

Although its primary purpose is to provide water for irrigation, the reservoir is also a popular recreational spot for locals and visitors. It was first inaugurated in 1968. It has an altitude of

References

External links
Embalse La Paloma 

La Paloma
Lakes of Coquimbo Region